Evandro Borges (born 18 June 1998), better known as Vandinho, is a Brazilian futsal player who plays for Tubarão and the Brazilian national futsal team as a winger.

References

External links
Liga Nacional de Futsal profile

1998 births
Living people
Brazilian men's futsal players